The 2022 Alabama A&M Bulldogs football team represented Alabama A&M University as a member of the East Division of the Southwestern Athletic Conference (SWAC) during the 2022 NCAA Division I FCS football season. Led by fifth-year head coach Connell Maynor, the Bulldogs played their home games at Louis Crews Stadium in Huntsville, Alabama.

Previous season

The Bulldogs finished the 2021 season with a record of 7–3, 5–3 SWAC play to finish in third place in the East Division.

Schedule

Game summaries

at UAB

at Troy

Austin Peay

at Florida A&M

Bethune–Cookman

Grambling State

Arkansas–Pine Bluff

Alabama State

at Mississippi Valley State

vs. No. 9 Jackson State

Texas Southern

Notes

References

Alabama AandM
Alabama A&M Bulldogs football seasons
Alabama AandM Bulldogs football